Gary John Gilmour (26 June 1951 – 10 June 2014) was an Australian cricketer who played in 15 Tests and 5 One Day Internationals (ODIs) between 1973 and 1977.

At the peak of his career, Gilmour combined "talented hitting" with "penetrative" left-arm swing bowling and strong slip catching. He earned comparisons to the Australian all-rounder Alan Davidson. He was called "Newcastle's greatest all-rounder and arguably its greatest cricketer".

Early life and education
Gary John Gilmour was born on 26 June 1951 in the Newcastle suburb of Waratah. He attended Waratah Primary School and Newcastle Boys High School.

He was awarded two "Blues" by the New South Wales Combined High Schools Sports Association: in 1967 (baseball) and 1969 (cricket).

Gilmour was selected to play for Newcastle while he was a teenager. At the age of 16 he was picked for Northern New South Wales against New Zealand and took 5–70 for Newcastle against Metropolitan when he was only 17.

He was picked in the Australian Schoolboys team to tour the West Indies in 1969–70 and in 1970–71 he was selected in the State Colts team.

First-class cricketer
Gilmour made his first class debut in 1971 and was selected in the New South Wales team to play South Australia in January 1972. He scored 40 in the first innings and 122 in the second. He also took 2–27 and 0–40.

Gilmour scored a duck in his next game, against Western Australia, but took four wickets with the ball. His third match, against South Australia, saw him take 4–69 in South Australia's second innings.

In 1972-73 season, Gilmour began the next summer well, taking seven wickets against WA (including his first five-for, 5–65) and scoring 72 runs. He struggled against South Australia, scored 53 playing against the touring Pakistan side for an invitational Tasmanian side took five wickets against Victoria and five wickets plus an innings of 73 against Queensland. People began to discuss him as an international prospect.

In 1973-74 season, he had early good form including seven wickets against WA, six wickets and a score of 59 against SA, four wickets against SA, and five against WA.

A good all round performance for New South Wales against the touring New Zealand team helped his cause considerably, taking seven wickets and making a score of 54. He was picked in the Australian side for the first test.

Before that game he almost took NSW to victory against Victoria, scoring 72 not out in an unsuccessful run chase and nabbing 4 wickets.

Test debut
Gilmour had an excellent debut. Australia batted first and scored 8–462; Gilmour scored 52 not out off 58 balls. New Zealand were dismissed for 237 with Gilmour taking 4–75. He only bowled three overs in the second innings as Australia's spinners took the bulk of the wickets; New Zealand only made 200.

Gilmour found things slightly tougher in the second test, taking 1–70 and 3–70 and making 3 with the bat in a drawn game. Gilmour was out-bowled in a Sheffield Shield game by Jeff Thomson and was made twelfth man for the third test so the Australian selectors could trial other bowlers. However he did make the squad to tour New Zealand in 1974. He took first class 45 wickets at 31 for the summer – this would be Gilmour's best ever aggregate.

In 1974 on New Zealand tour, Gilmour played against Auckland and took 2 wickets and scored 52 with the bat. He also took five wickets against Northern Districts,

He was made twelfth man for the first two tests. He took six wickets against Otago saw him back in the eleven for the third test. He took 7 wickets in a Test at Auckland, which included 5 for 64 in the first innings to set up a series-tying victory.

He also won man of the match award for the first ODI, taking 2–19 off 7 overs. He took 1–36 in the second ODI. Gilmour had taken 20 first class wickets on the tour at an average of just 15.

In 1974-75 competition for fast bowling places in the Australian team was intense at this time, especially once Dennis Lillee returned from injury and Jeff Thomson struck form. Gilmour wasn't selected for the 1974–75 Ashes series, with the selectors preferring Max Walker as the third pace bowler.

Highlights of the summer included an innings of 59 for NSW against the touring English, seven wickets against Victoria, 5–19 in a spell against Queensland, four wickets against WA and six against South Australia.

These efforts – 31 Shield wickets at 30 – earned him selection on the 1975 tour of England, in part because his all-round ability made him ideal for the World Cup one-day matches.

1975 World Cup
The Australians, inexperienced at one-day cricket, adopted a casual yet aggressive approach, often employing a full slips cordon for their opening bowlers. Gilmour was twelfth man in the early stages of the tournament, but selected for the semi-final against England at Headingley. On a day tailor-made for his style of bowling, he finished with 12 overs, 6 for 14, thus bowling out the opposition for 93. This was the first time that a bowler had taken 6 wickets in an ODI, and remained the best ODI bowling performance until Winston Davis claimed 7–51 in the 1983 competition.

With the Australians almost defeated at 39 for 6 in reply, Gilmour thrashed 28 not out off 28 balls to push his team into the final. Although Australia lost the final to West Indies, Gilmour bagged 5–48 and scored 14 off 11 balls.

1975 Ashes
Gilmour pressed for selection in the test side with some strong performances in tour games. This included 6 wickets against Kent, and 40 and 46 against Glamorgan. However he was made 12th man for the first two tests, despite scoring 102 in 75 minutes against Sussex. The selectors preferred Max Walker as third paceman.

Gilmour was called on only at Headingley, partly because of his World Cup effort there. He replaced Alan Turner. He bagged 6 for 85 in the first innings, three more in the second innings, in a game that was famously called off because protestors vandalised the pitch. Gilmour was dropped for the last Test.

1975–76: career peak
Gilmour's best season was in 1975–76. He started well, taking 5–75 and scoring 40 for NSW against Queensland. He followed this with scores of 65 and 75 and three wickets against WA (Kim Hughes's first-class debut). He scored 74 against South Australia and took three wickets for NSW against the touring West Indians.

Gilmour was picked in the side for the first test against the West Indies and this time it was Max Walker who was made 12th man. Gilmour took 4–42 and 2–26 helping Australia win the match.

Gilmour was kept on in the second test, with Australia opting for five bowlers (playing Gilmour and Walker, hoping Gilmour's batting would offset the loss of a specialist). Gilmour scored 48 (Australia's second highest score in their first innings) and took 2–103 as Australia lost by an innings.

In the sole ODI that summer, Gilmour took 2–48.

Gilmour was made 12th man for the third test with the selectors deciding to play Max Walker at his MCG home ground.

An injury to Dennis Lillee saw Gilmour back in the side for the fourth test. and he took 0–54 and 2–43, and scoring 20 with the bat.

In the fifth test, Gilmour hit 95 off 94 balls in Australia's first innings and got a duck in the second; he took 2–37 and 3–44 with the ball. In the sixth test he took 5–34 in the West Indies first innings, helping set up another Australian victory.

He finished the series with 20 wickets at 20.3.

He finished the summer with 104 for NSW against Victoria and 80 against South Australia.

That summer was his best with the bat, making 708 runs at 37. He also took 39 first class wickets at 30.

1976 tour of South Africa
Gilmour toured South Africa in 1976 with an International Wanderers side managed by Richie Benaud.

Highlights of the tour was the first game against the South African XI. The Wanderers were 9–228 in their second innings, only 158 runs ahead. Gilmour came out to bat at number 11 (number 10 was Alan Hurst) and proceeded to hit 80 runs in 64 minutes in a partnership of 96. This enabled the Wanderers to win the game. Richie Benaud said was one of the best innings he had seen. Gilmour did not repeat his form in the second game or the third. He scored 54 in a one-day game.

1976–77: decline
Gilmour's form dropped off sharply the following summer. He took 1–87 off 17 overs against Victoria and struggled to get wickets in other early-season games. He did take seven wickets in a game against Queensland.

He was chosen over Max Walker as third paceman for the first test against Pakistan, in support of Lillee and Thomson. Gilmour required a runner during the game, due to an injured ankle. He took 1–55 and 1–67 and scored 5 and 3.

Jeff Thomson was injured in that game, so Gilmour kept his place for the second test, taking 2–78 and 1–19. In the third test, he took 3–81, making it 8 wickets in 3 Tests at 37.5. Later it was revealed that Gimour had been bowling all summer with a bone "the size of a five-cent piece" floating around his heel.

Gilmour's weight led to him coming in for criticism. He would later tell the story of Don Bradman informing him that "If I was a selector you'd never play for Australia. You eat too many potatoes."

1977 tour of New Zealand
A brief tour to New Zealand followed, on which it became clear that Gilmour was struggling with a leg injury.

He scored 44 in an early tour one day game, but performed poorly with the ball, taking 0–56. Against Wellington he took 0–31 and 0–30, though scored 25 with the bat. Against Central Districts he took 0–40 and 1–28.

In the first test, Gilmour hit his only Test century, 101 in 146 balls and 187 minutes, combining with Doug Walters for an Australian record seventh-wicket partnership of 217.

"I can't think of a better Gilmour innings for Australia", said Greg Chappell. "1 know a lot of people thought he should be dropped, but that innings showed why he can't." He took 0–48 and 1–48 with the ball.

He also bowled poorly in the second test, taking 1–59 and 0–11 (off one over). "It certainly isn't helping us", said Greg Chappell. "He is not bowling as well as he should be". However he did score 64 with the bat.

1977 Centenary Test
Gilmour kept his place in the side for the Centenary Test at Melbourne in March 1977. Gilmour later says he "was a fool" for not pulling out of the test.  He scored 4 in Australia's first innings then bowled 5 overs to take 0–4. In Australia's second innings he made 16 and was only called on to bowl 4 overs (conceding 29 runs) in England's run chase, despite England scoring 417.

His poor form saw him omitted for selection on the 1977 Australian tour of England.

"I was driving over the Sydney Harbour Bridge one night and the team was read out", recalled Gimour. "My name wasn't in it. That really peeved me."

He had an operation to remove the bone shortly afterwards.

World Series Cricket
Gilmour signed to play World Series Cricket. "I had been in and out of the side for a couple of years and I knew that if I signed for World Series Cricket I was going to get some monetary reward for all the hours I'd spent in the past six or seven years. I knew that if I kept playing for the board I wasn't guaranteed any financial reward at all."

Gilmour later said, "When we first started playing World Series Cricket, I think we lost a lot of friends ... not player-wise, I don't think ... the players are OK. It's the officials that take a bit of swaying again... There were officials with the cricket association who I regarded as good friends and I had drinks with them whenever I was in Sydney or whenever they were in Newcastle. And they started treating me and the other players in WSC like lepers. I think that was the most hurtful thing of all. It was something that they didn't go along with and they just couldn't handle it".".

1977–78 summer
Gilmour had a patchy World Series Cricket. He was called into the main side when Dennis Lillee fell injured for the 4th Supertest in 1977–78 against the World XI. Gilmour took 3–103 and 4–26 in a game that Australia lost; he scored 10 and 26 (off 19 balls) with the bat.

He was kept on in the team for the 5th test, suffering badly at the hands of the World XI batsmen, and going for 1–141 in an Australian innings defeat. He scored 9 and 13.

Among his one-day games were one against the West Indies where he scored 23 off 20 balls and took 2–46. He scored 39 against the West Indies in another game and in the final took 2–14.

1978–79 summer
Gilmour began the 1978–79 season well with 5–20 in a warm-up game but was suspended for being "a bit overweight" on a tour of New Zealand. He was given a month to lose the weight and succeeded.

Highlights of the 1978–79 summer included putting on 75 in 51 minutes with Ian Chappell in a one-day game and taking a hat trick in a one-day game against the West Indies.

In the Supertests he took 3–28 and 3–57 against the World XI.

He toured the West Indies in 1978 with the Australian World Series team.

During World Series Cricket, Gilmour had the occasional run-in with Kerry Packer. He later recalled:
It was a freezing night at VFL Park in Melbourne and they had just introduced the stump microphone. Rainy, miserable night it was. Ray Bright was our 12th man and I spent several overs trying to get his attention. In the end, I yelled into the stump mic, 'Hey Brighty, where's me f—ing jumper?' I thought they'd cut it out, but apparently it went to air. Packer wasn't impressed. Got hauled over the coals for that one!

In 1979 Gilmour, reflecting on WSC, said: "I don't think I would have rushed into it like I rushed into it before."

In 2003 he would reflect that from "a financial point of view" joining World Series Cricket was the correct decision but "from a career point of view... I don't know. The jury's still out."

Gilmour said "From the cricket point of view, World Series Cricket was the hardest couple of years I've ever
played in my life. "But on the other aspect – my position in the Australian side – it seems, [from looking at] the players that the Australians picked for the establishment, I think I could have made it and probably could have finished up financially about the same – for playing less cricket. But I don't think it would have done my game any good because I know that playing World Series Cricket – it was tough – I think it made me a lot better cricketer."

Final years
Following the end of World Series Cricket, Gilmour only played two more first-class games for New South Wales. "They had me earmarked for destruction," he later claimed of the Australian cricket establishment.

He began the 1979–80 season well taking 5–35 and scoring 35 in a trial game. He was selected in the NSW side for the first Sheffield Shield game of the season, against WA. He took two catches and went for 0–93 and 1–11.

He was dropped for the next game in favour of Richard Done.

When asked if he thought he would get back in the Australian side, Gilmour said ""I dunno. It's going to be hard. It goes on performances too well in this game, so I've... been put in the back for a while." He added that "When I finish up [cricket], I'll finish up completely. I've been playing first-class cricket for about 10 years and what cricket's given to me I think I've put back into it. It's taken a lot of time out of my life and. I'm married and I've got two kids and I think I've sacrificed a lot in those 10 years just to play cricket, so I think when I finish I'll finish with cricket and start something else".

Gilmour was recalled to play Tasmania in a McDonald's Cup one-day game. He scored one batting at first drop and went for 0–25 off three overs as Tasmania won the game. Also in that competition took 2–28 in a game against Queensland, 2–39 in the semi final against WA and 1–53 and scored 21 in the final against Victoria, which NSW lost.

He played one more first-class game, against South Australia, taking 1–44 and 0–5. His first class career was over at the age of 27. However, he continued to play for Belmont in Newcastle District Competition.

In 1980–81 he scored 59 for Newcastle against the touring New Zealanders. He heel injury brought an early end to his summer.

There was some talk Gilmour might return to NSW ranks in 1981–82 but it did not happen. He did score a 102 off 101 balls for Country Northern against Country Southern.

Post-cricket career
In 2009 he was appointed manager of the Newcastle representative cricket team.

Awards and honors
He has been made a member of Waratah Primary School's Hall of Fame. In 2007, he was "named one of the best 30 players to have played one-day cricket for Australia". In 2010, the new training nets at Lugar Park, Kotara, were named in his honour.

Personal life
Gimour suffered poor health in the last years of his life. He had a congenital narrowing of the main artery to the liver and underwent a liver transplant in 2005. He suffered ill-health for many years, which was exacerbated by a fall. He died at Royal Prince Alfred Hospital in Sydney on 10 June 2014.

"He was at the front of the queue when they were handing out talent, but unfortunately he was right at the back of the queue when they handed out health and good luck", said his captain Ian Chappell.

Gary's elder brother, Greg "Sleepy" Gilmour, was the main force behind the Hunter Jaegers joining the national netball league, and played first-grade rugby union for Merewether-Carlton and Wanderers. His three sons, Clint, Ben and Sam Gilmour and nephews, Mitch and Nathan Gilmour, all played cricket.

Gilmour was married to Helen and together they had four children, Clint, Ben, Sam and Brooke. Clint Gilmour predeceased his father, dying of brain cancer aged 33 in March 2014.

Appraisal
Teammate Kerry O'Keeffe said on Gilmour's death:
He wasn't a gregarious bloke, really. He was actually quite retiring, but he was always up for a bit of fun. He never seemed to take his cricket all that seriously, in that country way. Numbers didn't mean much to him. In a lot of respects, he had that 'Hookesy' outlook. Why would you get eight not out in 10 overs? He couldn't understand, what's the use of that? His record suggests unfulfilled talent and I guess that's what it was to a certain extent.
Another teammate, Steve Bernard said:
As a cricketer he was the most talented player of my time, a guy who had extraordinary talents in every facet of cricket. In hindsight, he probably didn't reach the heights that he should have, based on his cricket ability, but the guys who played with him and against him will recognise he was a fantastic player, who was dynamic in anything he did in cricket. When he was on he was unplayable. He bowled a swinging ball, he could hit the ball a mile, throw it like a bullet and he was a fantastic catcher either close to the wicket or in the outfield – a supreme cricketer. He was a very popular person, Gus, a bit of a larrikin and very much liked by everyone. He didn't take life all that seriously, played for the enjoyment of it.

References

External links
 Whatever became of Gus Gilmour – article in The Age, March 2003

1951 births
2014 deaths
People educated at Newcastle Boys' High School
Cricketers at the 1975 Cricket World Cup
Australia Test cricketers
Australia One Day International cricketers
New South Wales cricketers
World Series Cricket players
Australian cricketers
Cricketers from Newcastle, New South Wales
Liver transplant recipients